George Gladir (September 27, 1925 – April 3, 2013) was an American writer for comic books. Primarily known as a scripter for Archie Comics, he co-created that publisher's character Sabrina Spellman, with artist Dan DeCarlo.

Biography 
George Gladir was born in New York City, the son of Russian immigrants, and attended Stuyvesant High School in Manhattan. Serving in the U.S. Army during World War II, he became a German prisoner of war after having taken part in the invasion of Normandy. Afterward, he attended the School of Visual Arts in New York before reenlisting in the Army and becoming an intelligence officer serving in Germany during the Korean War.

He became a full-time comic book writer in 1959, doing one-page gag fillers for Archie Comics' Archie's Joke Book and other titles. Writer and artist credits were not routinely given in comic books at that time. and Gladir's first confirmed credit is the gag page "Sign Language", drawn by Dan DeCarlo, in Archie's Girls Betty and Veronica #59 (Nov. 1960).

Gladir went on to write stories for several Archie Comics titles, including Archie's Pal Jughead, Reggie and Me, Betty and Me, and, primarily Archie's Girls Betty and Veronica. In Archie's Madhouse (the logo sometimes given as Archie's Mad House) #22 (Oct. 1962), the character Sabrina Spellman, by Gladir and DeCarlo, debuted in the humor anthology's lead story (the logo then spelled "Teen-Age"). She would eventually become one of the publisher's major characters, appearing in an animated series and a television sitcom. Gladir recalled in 2007,

In the early 1960s, Gladir also began writing for the satiric magazine Cracked, eventually becoming its head writer; over the next 30 years, he wrote approximately 2,000 pages for the magazine, many of them illustrated by John Severin.

In the late 2000s, Gladir and Stan Goldberg created the one-shot comic book Cindy and Her Obasan for Rorschach Entertainment.

Gladir, who was living in Oceanside, California, died on April 3, 2013.

Awards 
At the 2007 Comic Con, Gladir received the Bill Finger Award for Excellence in Comic Book Writing. Writer and historian Mark Evanier, who chaired the committee said, Gladir "laid down important groundwork on which other writers could and did build, just like Bill Finger did."

References

External links 
 

American comics writers
American people of Russian descent
Bill Finger Award winners
1925 births
2013 deaths
Archie Comics
Inkpot Award winners
Sabrina the Teenage Witch